The 2018 Asian Men's Volleyball Challenge Cup was the inaugural edition of the Asian Challenge Cup, a biennial international volleyball tournament organised by the Asian Volleyball Confederation (AVC) with Sri Lanka Volleyball Federation (SLVF). The tournament was held in Colombo, Sri Lanka from 15 to 21 September 2018.

Qualification

The 8 AVC member associations qualified for the 2018 Asian Men's Challenge Cup. Sri Lanka qualified as hosts and the 3 teams were qualified from the 2017 Asian Men's Volleyball Championship while the 4 teams are new entry. The 8 AVC members associations were from 4 zonal associations, including, Central Asia (2 teams), East Asia (2 team), Southeast Asia (1 team), and Western Asia (3 teams). Fiji and Uzbekistan withdrew from the tournament.

Qualified teams
The following teams qualified for the tournament.

Pools composition
The following teams qualified for the tournament.

Preliminary round

Pool standing procedure
 Number of matches won
 Match points
 Sets ratio
 Points ratio
 Result of the last match between the tied teams

Match won 3–0 or 3–1: 3 match points for the winner, 0 match points for the loser
Match won 3–2: 2 match points for the winner, 1 match point for the loser

Pool A

Pool B

Final round

Final eight

Quarterfinals

5th–8th semifinals

Semifinals

7th place match

5th place match

3rd place match

Final

Final standing

Awards

Most Valuable Player
 Albakheet Ahmed
Best Outside Spikers
 Deepthi Romesh
 Horosit Biswas
Best Setter
 Haneed Jabbar Mustafa

Best Opposite Spiker
 Nameer Shamil Hussain
Best Middle Blocker
 Majrashi Ibrahim
 Sachit Challab Islam
Best Libero
 Lakmal Wijesekara

See also
2018 Asian Women's Volleyball Challenge Cup
2018 Asian Men's Volleyball Cup

References

External links
 Asian Volleyball Confederation

2018
Asian Challenge Cup
Challenge Cup, Men, 2018
2018 in Sri Lankan sport
September 2018 sports events in Asia